Stafford Lake County Park is a park in the Marin County, California parks system, managed by the Marin County Department of Parks and Open Space.

The lake is man-made and there is no boating or swimming allowed.  The land in the park includes lakefront fields, creek, meadows and some redwood groves, and is named for the Stafford Farm, on which the lake sits.  The park hosts many events such as concerts, known as Rock'n Blues by the Lake, with bands such as Journey, Yonder Mountain String Band and Jefferson Starship.  For a number of years the park hosted the Marin Renaissance fair.

Bike park 
In mid-2017, a bike park was added to Stafford Lake, featuring courses of all skill levels and great views of the lake. The park is currently being expanded.

Disc golf
The disc golf course was first constructed as an object course in 1993 and baskets were installed in 1997.  In 2007, three concrete tees were installed.  The course is long by most standards and is very hilly, and in turn very challenging.  Walking the course is approximately a  walk and is mildly strenuous due to the very hilly nature of the terrain.  Each of the 18 holes have one or two tees and two to five pin locations, with a total of 60 basket locations in total.  Course length can vary from  if all holes were short to  if all holes were in long.  The 'traditional' layout is a hefty .

Gallery

See also
 List of lakes in California
 List of lakes in the San Francisco Bay Area

References

Stafford Lake at Marin County Parks and Open Space website
 disc golf course information at Professional Disc Golf Association website
 

Parks in Marin County, California
Regional parks in California